Adrian Ungur became the inaugural champion of Sibiu Challenger by defeating fellow countryman Victor Hănescu in the final, 6–4, 7–6(7–1).

Seeds

Draw

Finals

Top half

Bottom half

References
Main Draw
Qualifying Singles

BRD Sibiu Challenger - Singles
BRD Sibiu Challenger